The 2018–19 season was Al-Fateh's 10th consecutive season in the Pro League and their 61st year in existence. The club participated in the Pro League and the King Cup.

The season covered the period from 1 July 2018 to 30 June 2019.

Players

Squad information

Out on loan

Transfers

In

Loans in

Out

Loans out

Competitions

Overall

Last Updated: 16 May 2019

Pro League

League table

Results summary

Results by round

Matches
All times are local, AST (UTC+3).

King Cup

All times are local, AST (UTC+3).

Statistics

Squad statistics

Last updated on 16 May 2019.

|-
! colspan=14 style=background:#dcdcdc; text-align:center|Goalkeepers

|-
! colspan=14 style=background:#dcdcdc; text-align:center|Defenders

|-
! colspan=14 style=background:#dcdcdc; text-align:center|Midfielders

|-
! colspan=14 style=background:#dcdcdc; text-align:center|Forwards

|-
! colspan=14 style=background:#dcdcdc; text-align:center| Players sent out on loan this season

|-
! colspan=14 style=background:#dcdcdc; text-align:center| Player who made an appearance this season but have left the club

|}

Goalscorers

Last Updated: 11 May 2019

Assists

Last Updated: 11 May 2019

Clean sheets

Last Updated: 11 April 2019

References

Al-Fateh SC seasons
Fateh